Róbert Ambrusics (born 22 January 1992) is a Hungarian footballer who is last known to have played as a goalkeeper for Iváncsa.

Career

Ambrusics started his career with English second division side Leicester. Before the second half of 2010–11, he was sent on loan to Stafford Rangers in the English sixth division. In 2011, Ambrusics signed for Hungarian top flight club Vasas after trialing for Ferencváros in Hungary, German second division team Fortuna Düsseldorf, and FC Utrecht in the Dutch top flight. At Vasas he made 1 league appearances and 3 cup appearances. Before the second half of 2011–12, he signed for English outfit Cambridge United. In 2012, Ambrusics signed for DVTK in the Hungarian top flight. In 2013, he signed for Hungarian second division side Siófok, where he played 1 league game and 3 cup games. In January 2016, he signed for Szentlőrinc in the Hungarian third division.

References

1992 births
Sportspeople from Pécs
Living people
Hungarian footballers
Association football goalkeepers
Leicester City F.C. players
Redditch United F.C. players
Stafford Rangers F.C. players
Vasas SC players
Cambridge United F.C. players
Diósgyőri VTK players
BFC Siófok players
Nemzeti Bajnokság I players
Expatriate footballers in England
Hungarian expatriate footballers
Hungarian expatriate sportspeople in England